The Hudson Prize is an American literary award for a collection of poetry or fiction. The award is administered by Black Lawrence Press. It was previously awarded, under a different endowment, as the Ontario Prize.  Poets & Writers magazine has consistently listed it as a "top ten" literary prize in its annual rankings. It is the largest and longest-running single category/multiple genre book prize in the United States.

In 2013, three of the 25 recipients of National Endowment for the Arts grants were past winners of the Hudson Prize.

Recent winners

References

English-language literary awards